The Kungwe apalis (Apalis argentea) is a species in the family Cisticolidae.  It was previously considered it to be a subspecies of the buff-throated apalis.  It is found in Burundi, Democratic Republic of the Congo, Rwanda, and Tanzania.

Its natural habitats are subtropical or tropical dry forest and subtropical or tropical moist montane forest.
It is threatened by habitat loss.

References

 BirdLife International 2013.  Apalis argentea. Downloaded from http://www.birdlife.org   on 16 March 2013.

Kungwe apalis
Birds of East Africa
Kungwe apalis
Taxonomy articles created by Polbot
Taxobox binomials not recognized by IUCN